Bennemühlen station is a railway station in the municipality of Bennemühlen, located in the Hanover Region district in Lower Saxony, Germany.

References

Railway stations in Lower Saxony
Buildings and structures in Hanover Region